The Kaniadakis Gaussian distribution (also known as κ-Gaussian distribution) is a probability distribution which arises as a generalization of the Gaussian distribution from the maximization of the Kaniadakis entropy under appropriated constraints. It is one example of a Kaniadakis κ-distribution. The κ-Gaussian distribution has been applied successfully for describing several complex systems in economy, geophysics, astrophysics, among many others. 

The κ-Gaussian distribution is a particular case of the κ-Generalized Gamma distribution.

Definitions

Probability density function 
The general form of the centered Kaniadakis κ-Gaussian probability density function is: 

 
where  is the entropic index associated with the Kaniadakis entropy,  is the scale parameter, and 
  
is the normalization constant.

The standard Normal distribution is recovered in the limit

Cumulative distribution function 

Properties

Moments, mean and variance 
The centered  κ-Gaussian distribution has a moment of odd order equal to zero, including the mean.

Kurtosis 
The kurtosis of the centered  κ-Gaussian distribution may be computed thought:

 
which can be written asThus, the kurtosis of the centered  κ-Gaussian distribution is given by:or

κ-Error function 

The Kaniadakis κ-Error function (or κ-Error function) is a one-parameter generalization of the ordinary error function defined as:

Although the error function cannot be expressed in terms of elementary functions, numerical approximations are commonly employed.

For a random variable  distributed according to a κ-Gaussian distribution with mean 0 and standard deviation , κ-Error function means the probability that X falls in the interval  .

Applications 
The κ-Gaussian distribution has been applied in several areas, such as:
 In economy, the κ-Gaussian distribution has been applied in the analysis of financial models, accurately representing the dynamics of the processes of extreme changes in stock prices.
 In inverse problems, Error laws in extreme statistics are robustly represented by κ-Gaussian distributions.
 In astrophysics, stellar-residual-radial-velocity data have a Gaussian-type statistical distribution, in which the K index presents a strong relationship with the stellar-cluster ages.
 In nuclear physics, the study of Doppler broadening function in nuclear reactors is well described by a κ-Gaussian distribution for analyzing the neutron-nuclei interaction.
 In cosmology, for interpreting the dynamical evolution of the Friedmann-Robertson-Walker Universe.
 In plasmas physics, for analyzing the electron distribution in electron-acoustic double-layers and the dispersion of Langmuir waves.

See also 

 Giorgio Kaniadakis
 Kaniadakis statistics
 Kaniadakis distribution
 Kaniadakis κ-Exponential distribution
 Kaniadakis κ-Gamma distribution
 Kaniadakis κ-Weibull distribution
 Kaniadakis κ-Logistic distribution
 Kaniadakis κ-Erlang distribution

References

External links
Kaniadakis Statistics on arXiv.org

Probability distributions
Mathematical and quantitative methods (economics)